Niculescu is a Romanian surname. Notable people with the surname include:

Bogdan Niculescu-Duvăz, politician and architect
Cezar Niculescu, basketball player
Claudiu Niculescu, soccer player
Dan Niculescu, basketball player
Margareta Niculescu, artist, puppeteer, director, teacher and theater director
Monica Niculescu, tennis player
Nifon Niculescu, bishop
Radu Niculescu, soccer player
Stefan Niculescu, composer

See also
Nicolescu

Romanian-language surnames
Patronymic surnames
Surnames from given names